This is a list of awards and nominations received by South Korean actor Lee Byung-hun.

Awards and nominations

Other accolades

State honors

Lists

Notes

References

Lee Byung-hun